The Bodil Award for Best Screenplay is a film award established in 2015 by the Danish Film Critics Association in collaboration with the Danish Writers Guild for the best screenplay that was handed out for the first time as an external award at the 68th Bodil Awards-ceremony.

Recipients 
 2015:  for Silent Heart
 2016: May el-Toukhy and Maren Louise Käehne for 
 2017: Christian Tafdrup for Parents
 2019: Jakob Weis for That Time of Year
 2020:  for 
 2021: Thomas Vinterberg and Tobias Lindholm for Another Round

See also 

 Robert Award for Best Screenplay

References

External links 
  

2015 establishments in Denmark
Awards established in 2015
Screenplay